Whiteville is a city in Columbus County, North Carolina, United States. The population was 5,394 at the 2010 census. It is the largest city in Columbus County and is the county seat.

History
Columbus County was created in 1808. In 1810, a community was platted on land owned by James B. White for the purpose of creating a county seat and establishing government buildings. It was originally known as White's Crossing before being incorporated under its present name in 1832. A post office called Whiteville has been in operation since 1821. The town was sacked by Union forces during the latter stages of the American Civil War.

In 1950, Whiteville fielded a professional minor league baseball team in the Class D Tobacco State League. The Whiteville Tobs club lasted only one season before disbanding with the entire league.

The Columbus County Courthouse was listed on the National Register of Historic Places in 1983.

Geography
Whiteville is located in north-central Columbus County at  (34.330096, -78.704533). The town lies within the Carolina Border Belt, a regional network of tobacco markets and warehouses along both sides of the North Carolina-South Carolina border. Combined U.S. Routes 74 and 76 bypass the city on its north side and lead east  to Wilmington. US 74 leads northwest  to Lumberton, and US 76 leads west  to Florence, South Carolina. U.S. Route 701 passes through the western side of Whiteville, leading north  to Elizabethtown and southwest  to Conway, South Carolina.

Climate

Demographics

2020 census

As of the 2020 United States census, there were 4,766 people, 2,153 households, and 1,337 families residing in the city. Between 2010 and 2020, the town lost 11.64 percent of its population.

2000 census
As of the census of 2000, there were 5,148 people, 2,191 households, and 1,336 families residing in the city. The population density was 957.5 people per square mile (369.5/km). There were 2,450 housing units at an average density of 455.7 per square mile (175.8/km). The racial makeup of the city was 60.51% White, 36.67% African American, 0.64% Native American, 0.74% Asian, 0.04% Pacific Islander, 0.56% from other races, and 0.84% from two or more races. Hispanic or Latino of any race were 0.93% of the population.

There were 2,191 households, out of which 27.9% had children under the age of 18 living with them, 38.1% were married couples living together, 20.4% had a female householder with no husband present, and 39.0% were non-families. 36.3% of all households were made up of individuals, and 16.4% had someone living alone who was 65 years of age or older. The average household size was 2.22 and the average family size was 2.88.

In the city, the population was spread out, with 24.1% under the age of 18, 7.8% from 18 to 24, 23.5% from 25 to 44, 24.4% from 45 to 64, and 20.1% who were 65 years of age or older. The median age was 41 years. For every 100 females, there were 77.8 males. For every 100 females age 18 and over, there were 72.9 males.

Less than a fourth of the citizens hold a bachelor's degree.

The median income for a household in the city was $25,455, and the median income for a family was $34,128. Males had a median income of $35,074 versus $23,000 for females. The per capita income for the city was $18,337. About 19.0% of families and 26.9% of the population were below the poverty line, including 37.0% of those under age 18 and 33.7% of those age 65 or over, resulting in over a third of the residents living in poverty.

Education
The Whiteville City School system includes the following schools:
 Whiteville High School
 Southeastern Early College High School
 Columbus Christian Academy
 North Whiteville Academy
 Central Middle School
 Edgewood Elementary School
 Whiteville Primary School

Whiteville High School, home of the Wolfpack, competes in the NCHSAA 2A sports division and has won 19 state championships: nine in baseball (1983, 1985, 1989, 1991, 2012, 2014, 2015, 2017, and 2018), four individual track championships, one in team golf (1986), two in football (1965 and 1987), and three in basketball (1969, 1999, and 2000).

Waccamaw Academy, which opened in 1968, closed in 2012.

Southeastern Community College is located a few miles to the west of Whiteville.

Arts and culture

The city is the site of the North Carolina Museum of Natural Sciences at Whiteville, a satellite museum of the North Carolina Museum of Natural Sciences.

Annual events include the North Carolina Pecan Harvest Festival. In addition, the state-recognized Waccamaw Siouan tribe holds an annual powwow in October with numerous public events.

The News Reporter, the official newspaper that serves Columbus County, is based in Whiteville. It has been published since 1896.

The stretch of U.S. Route 701 through Columbus County is named for Whiteville's founder, James B. White, who was elected as Columbus County's first state senator.

Representation in other media
Whiteville was the site of filming for the courthouse-burning scene in the 1996 Bastard out of Carolina, adapted from Dorothy Allison's novel of the same name.

Transportation
Although the railroad tracks leading from west of town toward Lake Waccamaw have long been disconnected, Whiteville is served by the Columbus County Municipal Airport and several highways, which include U.S. Route 74, U.S. Route 76, U.S. Route 701, North Carolina Highway 130, and North Carolina Highway 131.

Notable people 
 A. R. Ammons, American poet who won the National Book Award for Poetry in 1973 and 1993
 Ulysses Currie, American politician who represented Maryland
 Dax Harwood, professional wrestler for AEW
 MacKenzie Gore, professional baseball player and third overall selection in 2017 MLB Draft
 Tommy Greene, MLB pitcher
 Pat Lennon, MLB outfielder
 Chester McGlockton, three-time All-Pro NFL defensive tackle
 Millie and Christine McKoy, conjoined twins
 Jane McNeill, stage, film, and television actress
 Ida Stephens Owens, first African American woman to earn a Ph.D. in physiology from Duke University, in 1967
 Charlie Ripple, MLB pitcher
 Reggie Royals, professional basketball player
 Ralph E. Suggs, retired Real admiral in the United States Navy
 Chris Wilcox, NBA player
 Maggie Will, professional golfer and three-time winner on the LPGA Tour
 Harvey D. Williams, African-American U.S. Army major general
Mike Wright, MLB pitcher

References

Works cited

External links
 City of Whiteville official website
 Greater Whiteville Chamber of Commerce
 Whiteville City Schools
 The News Reporter
  WTOP News Coat Drive

Cities in North Carolina
Cities in Columbus County, North Carolina
County seats in North Carolina